A patent attorney is an attorney who has the specialized qualifications necessary for representing clients in obtaining patents and acting in all matters and procedures relating to patent law and practice, such as filing patent applications and oppositions to granted patents. The term is used differently in different countries, and thus may or may not require the same legal qualifications as a general legal practitioner.

The titles patent agent and patent lawyer are also used in some jurisdictions. In some jurisdictions the terms are interchangeable, while in others the latter is used only if the person is qualified as a lawyer.

Qualification regimes 
In Europe, requirements for practising as patent attorney before national patent offices should be distinguished from those needed for practising before the European Patent Office (EPO) or the Eurasian Patent Office (EAPO). On the national level, the requirements are not harmonized, although across the 27 Member States of the European Union respective professional qualifications are mutually recognised to some degree.

Australia
Registration as a patent attorney in Australia and New Zealand is administered by the Trans-Tasman IP Attorneys Board (the Board).

To apply to become a Trans-Tasman patent attorney, one must:

 pass the nine topics set out in Schedule 5 to the Patent Regulations 1991.
 hold a suitable tertiary educational qualification in a field of technology that contains potentially patentable subject matter.
 be a resident in Australia or New Zealand
 have been employed in a position or positions, for at least 2 continuous years or a total of 2 years within 5 continuous years, that provide the applicant experience in the following skills:
 searching patent records;
 preparation filing and prosecution of patent applications in Australia and with other countries;
 drafting of patent specifications;
 and provision of advice on interpretation, infringement and validity.
 be of good fame, integrity or character, and not have been convicted within the past five years of offences against Patents, Trade Marks and Designs legislation.

Until the late 1990s, topics were mainly taught and examined by members of the patent attorney profession under the oversight of the PSB, but this process has now been brought into the university system within Australia.

Once registered, a Patent and Trademark Attorney may be elected as a Fellow of the Institute of Patent and Trade Mark Attorneys of Australia.

Canada 

To become a registered patent agent in Canada one must complete a series of four qualifying exams over four days. As of May 1, 2014, a patent agent trainee can sit the exams if the trainee is a resident in Canada and has worked in Canada in the area of Canadian patent law and practice, including the preparation and prosecution of applications, for a period of at least 24 months. Up to 12 months of practical experience will also be recognized for those entitled to practice before the patent office of another country. One may also qualify to sit for the exams if the individual is a resident of Canada and has been employed for at least 24 months on the examining staff at the Canadian patent office.

Each of the four exams (also referred to individually as Paper A, B, C, and D) is four hours in length.  Paper A relates to the drafting of a patent application.  Paper B relates to the validity of a patent.  Paper C relates to the preparation of a response to an Official Action.  Paper D relates to the infringement of a patent.  Unlike the US system, the Canadian examination format is paper based with a variety of essay-type and short answer questions and is offered at least once a year, typically in April.  Results are typically known within 5 months.

With a first-time passing rate near 1% and an overall passing rate of 7% in 2012 and trending downwards, the exam is notoriously challenging and most applicants attempt the exam over several years. To pass, candidates must score a minimum of 50 out of 100 on each paper, with a minimum aggregate mark of 240 on all four papers.  Recent amendments to the pass requirements enable candidates to carry forward marks for a paper (if greater than 60 out of 100) if the minimum aggregate mark is not achieved or if the candidate failed one of the papers.

Review courses are held each summer and fall by IPIC (Intellectual Property Institute of Canada).  The summer course tends to be more general in scope than the fall course, where drafting practice examinations is emphasised.

Once certified, a registered patent agent is given powers under the Canadian Patent Act to represent applicants applying to the Canadian Intellectual Property Office to obtain patent protection.

European Patent Organisation 

The task of the European Patent Office (EPO), which is the main organ of the European Patent Organisation, is to grant European patents (and also to hear and determine third-party challenges to the validity of European patents, in opposition proceedings). The EPO exists by virtue of the European Patent Convention (EPC), and is not legally bound to the European Union.

To legally represent clients (generally patent applicants, proprietors and opponents) before the EPO, a patent attorney must first be registered to act in that capacity as a professional representative. To be registered, an individual must qualify as a European patent attorney and, to that end, must pass a written examination, the European Qualifying Examination (EQE). The EQE consists of four papers sat over three days, each day lasting between 5 hours and six and a half hours. Those who enroll for the examination must have an engineering or scientific degree (though long experience in a scientific domain can be sufficient under certain limited conditions), and the candidate must also have practiced under supervision for at least three years in the domain of national or European patent law.

The EPC sets out the circumstances under which an applicant for a European patent must be represented by a professional representative in proceedings before the EPO. Typically, a representative is required if the patent applicant (or all of them if more than one) does not have a place of business in an EPC contracting state.

Germany 
In Germany, only Patentanwälte/patent attorneys (or Rechtsanwälte/attorneys-at-Law, who are per se entitled to represent clients in all fields of law) are entitled to represent clients from abroad before the German Patent and Trade Mark Office (DPMA). German patent attorneys have done their university degrees in engineering or natural sciences and practised in industry before being accepted for an additional three years' education, i. e. completing legal training of 26 month with an established German patent attorney, at the same time studies of German Law and afterwards a training in intellectual property and an examination at the DPMA. They are further entitled to represent their clients before the German federal court of patents (and trademarks) and in patent cases (nullity) before the German Supreme Court.

Hong Kong 
In Hong Kong, there is no regulation on the profession of patent attorneys or agents. The main reason is that Hong Kong does not have a standard patent (20 years) original grant system. Hong Kong recognizes standard patents or patents for invention registered and granted in the People's Republic of China, European Patent Office (designated UK), or United Kingdom. These patents can be re-registered in Hong Kong without examination within a prescribed period. On October 4, 2011, the Hong Kong SAR Government published a Consultation Paper on Review of the Patent System in Hong Kong.

India 
In India, a person registered to practice before Indian Patent Office is called a "Registered Patent Agent" or simply "Patent agent". The Indian Patent Law specifically does not mention the designation of "Patent Attorney".

Indian Patent Office conducts a qualifying examination for patent agent registration yearly (earlier, it was twice a year). Indian Patent Law mandates a science or technical degree for person(s) to appear for the qualifying examination. Other criteria for eligibility include being an Indian Citizen, and 21 years of age. There are approximately 2000 registered patent agents in India as of April 1, 2010.

However, a decision on March 15, 2013 by the Madras High Court (Single Judge), stated that advocates, by possessing a law degree from a recognized university, have a right to file, appear and undertake all responsibilities of a patent agent. The single judge rejected the contention that to appear before the Patent Office, advocates required additional specific science/technical qualification such as B.Tech in Information Technology etc. According to this judgement, Advocates having degree in Engineering and Science are "Registered Patent Attorney" in India.

Ireland 
Under Section 107 of Ireland's Patents Act, 1992 entry in the Register of Patent Agents requires that the applicant resides and has a place in a member state of the European Union and possesses the prescribed educational and professional qualifications, which are:
 Leaving Certificate or equivalent: a C grade in at least two higher level subjects (or ordinary level B grade) and a D grade in at least three other subjects
 First-year university (or equivalent) education in engineering, chemistry, or physics
 Employment for at least 3 years in the office of a registered patent agent in an EU member state
 Success at the following examinations:
Irish law and practice of patents (set by Irish Patents Office)
Drafting of patent specifications (set by United Kingdom's JEB, Advanced Paper P3)
Amendment of patent specifications (set by United Kingdom's JEB, Advanced Paper P4)
Infringement and validity (set by United Kingdom's JEB, Advanced Paper P6)

As in the UK (see below), exemptions from the Drafting and Amendment papers can be obtained if the equivalent papers in the European Qualifying Examination have been passed.

Japan

Patent specialists in Japan are known as benrishi and must take a qualifying exam to receive the title. Benrishi are allowed to practice a variety of intellectual property law (patent, trademark, copyright, unfair competition and trade secret) and are given the power to represent clients in litigation and arbitration within the area specified by Patent Attorney Law in Japan. Barristers (bengoshi) are also qualified to work as patent attorneys in Article 3 of Practicing Attorney Law in Japan.
A patent attorney shall automatically be admitted to the Japan Patent Attorneys Association (Patent Attorney Act Art. 60).

New Zealand

To become registered as a Patent Attorney in New Zealand, one must:

be a New Zealand citizen, Commonwealth citizen (British subject) or a citizen of the Republic of Ireland.
be aged 21 (twenty one) years of age or over.
have passed the New Zealand Patent Attorney Examinations.
be of good character.
have been employed for a period(s) of at least three years by a Patent Attorney in New Zealand, The Patent Office, or in a form of employment that offers substantially similar practical experience - see section 100 of the Patents Act 1953:

Registration as a Patent Attorney may then lead to election as a Fellow in the New Zealand Institute of Patent Attorneys.

Moreover, Australian Patent Attorneys are able to obtain registration to become New Zealand Patent Attorneys, and vice versa, as a result of a trans Tasman agreement between the two countries. Consequently, a large number of Australian Patent Attorneys are also New Zealand Patent Attorneys.

Russia
To become registered as a patent attorney in Russia, one must:
 be a Russian citizen,
 be a permanent resident in Russia,
 be aged 18 years of age or over,
 to have a higher education degree,
 to have not less than 4 years of an experience in the particular sphere (see below),
 to pass a qualification exam.

There are some specializations of patent attorneys:

 inventions and utility models,
 industrial designs,
 trademarks and service marks,
 names of places of origin of goods,
 computer programs, database, integrated circuits topologies.

The qualification exam shall be held on each of above-mentioned specializations separately.

After successful passing the qualification exam a person is included in the register of patent attorneys which is maintained by the Federal Service for Intellectual Property. After that, the Federal Service for Intellectual Property issues a certificate of patent attorney to a person who passed the exam; certificate indicates the specialization of patent attorney.

A patent attorney carry out their professional activity throughout Russia individually or as employee of patent bureau. A patent attorney can not be government official, municipal official, notary, judge, elected official. A patent attorney may combine his status with the status of an advocate.

As of the beginning of the 2019, there were 2001 patent attorneys in Russia. Most of them are located in Moscow (1194) and Saint Petersburg (298). Patent attorneys are entirely absent from 23 regions of Russia.

Singapore

To become registered as a Patent Agent in Singapore, one must:

 be a resident in Singapore;
 hold a university degree or equivalent qualification approved by the Registrar;
 have passed the Graduate Certificate in IP Law Course jointly offered by the IP Academy, Singapore and the Faculty of Law, National University of Singapore.;
 have passed the 4 patent examinations; and
 has completed internship in patent agency work under the supervision of a registered patent agent, or an individual registered as a patent agent or its equivalent in a country or territory, or by a patent office, specified in the Fourth Schedule, for a continuous period of at least 12 months; or a total period of at least 12 months within a continuous period of 24 months.

Once registered, a Patent Agent may then be elected as an ordinary member of the Association of Patent Attorneys of Singapore.

South Africa

Patent attorneys in South Africa are qualified attorneys – see Attorneys in South Africa – who have additionally specialised through the South African Institute of Intellectual Property Law. This requires:
 a technical or scientific diploma or degree from a university or technikon, involving at least a three-year course of study;
 six months' practical training in the office of a registered practicing patent attorney;
 sitting the Patent Board Examination.

Taiwan 

Taiwan is a technology-intensive industrialized developed country, and receives more than 80,000 patent applications a year (2006~2008).  However, for political reasons, Taiwan is not a member state of the World Intellectual Property Organization (WIPO).  To become a registered patent attorney in Taiwan, one must pass the Patent Attorney's Examination administered by the Examination Yuan, complete the required pre-practice training course (60 hours) with Taiwan Intellectual Property Office, and join the Taiwan Patent Attorney's Association.
 The Examination.  Nationals of the Republic of China(Taiwan), who are graduates in science, engineering, medicine, agriculture, life sciences, intellectual property rights, design, law or information management of public or accredited private colleges or higher institutions, or of an overseas institution of equivalent grade that complies with Ministry of Education criteria, and who hold certificates to this effect, are eligible to apply to take the examination for patent attorneys.  Foreign nationals, who possess the same qualifications are eligible to apply to take this examination.  The following subjects are given in the Examination (each subject is worth 100 points and an average of 60 points is required to attain a passing grade):
 the Patent Act;
 the Administrative Procedure Act and Administrative Enforcement Act;
 Standards for Patent Review and Patent Applications and Practice;
 Calculus, General Physics and General Chemistry;
 Professional English or Professional Japanese (to be chosen at the discretion of the candidate);
 One of: Engineering Dynamics, Biotechnology, Electronics, Physical Chemistry, Basic Design or Computer Architecture (to be chosen at the discretion of the candidate).
 Pre-Practice Training.  The training is held annually or biannually.  It consists of 57 hours of course work and 3 hours of examination.
 Taiwan Patent Attorney's Association.  Established on December 11, 2009, and registered with the Ministry of Internal Affairs on December 30, 2009.

Currently, attorneys-at-law in Taiwan who have only passed the lawyer bar examination are allowed to represent applicants before Taiwan Intellectual Property Office for patent matters.  However, these attorneys-at-law normally do not have a scientific or technical degree.

Ukraine 

To become a patent attorney in Ukraine, one must:

 be a citizen of Ukraine;
 to have a higher degree, and a higher degree in the IP protection sphere;
 to have not less than 5 years of an experience in the IP protection sphere;
 to pass a qualification examinations, attestation and to receive a certificate on a right to act as a patent attorney ;

Currently in Ukraine there are above 300 registered patent attorneys (data on September 10, 2012). Their legal status is regulated by the Cabinet of Ministers of Ukraine Enactment "On affirmation of the Provision about the representatives in the sphere of intellectual property (patent attorneys)" № 545 on September 10, 1994. Examination and registration of patent attorneys are conducted by the State Intellectual Property Service of Ukraine.

United Kingdom 

Any person can act at the UK Patent Office, but the titles "Patent Agent", "Patent Attorney" and "Registered Patent Attorney" (which is synonymous with "Registered Patent Agent") are reserved for those duly qualified.  The title "Patent Attorney" may also be used by solicitors provided that they have specialist expertise in patents, whereas the term "Patent Agent" relates to persons who have passed the relevant specialized examinations.

Qualification is achieved by passing the PEB patent foundation level papers (or gaining an exemption by passing certain university courses such as that organised by Queen Mary University in London) and then the PEB patent advanced level papers.

The PEB patent foundation papers are FC1 (formerly P1) - UK Patent Law and Procedures, FC2 (formerly "Law") - Basic English Law, FC3 (formerly P5) - International Patent Law, FC4 (formerly "D&C") - Designs & Copyright, FC5 (formerly P7) - Trade Mark Law.

The PEB patent advanced papers are FD1 (formerly P2) - Patent Practice, FD2 (formerly P3) - Drafting a Patent Application, FD3 (formerly P4) - Amending a Patent Application and FD4 (formerly P6) - Infringement and Validity of a Patent.  Exemptions from FD2 and FD3 can be obtained by passing the corresponding European Qualifying Exams (Papers A & B respectively).

Membership of the Chartered Institute of Patent Attorneys as a Fellow gives the right to call oneself a Chartered Patent Agent or Chartered Patent Attorney.  (To be elected as a Fellow, a person must have passed the UK Advanced Level exams, have accrued sufficient professional experience and be nominated by two existing Fellows).

United States

In the United States, a practitioner may either be a patent attorney or patent agent. Both patent attorneys and patent agents have the same license to practice and represent clients before the United States Patent and Trademark Office (USPTO). Both patent agents and patent attorneys may prepare, file, and prosecute patent applications.  Patent agents and patent attorneys may also provide patentability opinions, as noted by the U.S. Supreme Court in Sperry v. Florida. In the time since the USPTO issued the first patent in 1790, approximately 73,000 citizens have passed the USPTO registration examination, allowing them to register to prosecute patent applications. (This total does not include current patent examiners, who are not allowed to serve as patent attorneys or agents and thus do not appear on the list of enrolled practitioners.) Today, roughly 45,000 people are on the list of registered patent attorneys and agents, with slightly less than 34,000 of them also licensed to practice law.  Of the states, California has the most patent attorneys (and agents), followed by New York and Texas. Per capita, Delaware has more patent attorneys (and agents) than any state (not including DC). Both Patent Attorneys and Patent Agents are generally required to have a technical degree (such as engineering, chemistry or physics) and must take and pass the USPTO registration examination (officially titled Examination for Registration to Practice in Patent Cases Before the United States Patent and Trademark Office, and commonly referred to as the Patent Bar).

Patent attorneys must also be admitted to the practice of law in at least one state or territory of the U.S. or in the District of Columbia. Since patent attorneys are admitted to practice law in a state or territory, they can additionally provide legal services outside the Patent Office if practicing within the jurisdiction they are admitted to practice or if the law of the jurisdiction otherwise permits them to practice although not admitted in that jurisdiction. These legal services include advising a client on matters relating to the licensing of the invention; whether to appeal a decision by the Patent Office to a court; whether to sue for infringement; whether someone is infringing upon the claims of a client's issued patent; and conversely, whether a client is infringing the claims of someone else's issued patent.  Patent agents cannot provide legal services of this nature, nor can they represent clients before the Trademark Office part of the USPTO.

To register as a patent agent or patent attorney, one must pass the USPTO registration examination.  This exam, commonly referred to as the "patent bar", tests a candidate's knowledge of patent law and USPTO policies and procedures as set forth in the Manual of Patent Examining Procedure (MPEP). The exam consists of 100 questions in multiple choice format, and is open-book with examinees permitted to use a PDF version of the MPEP. An unofficial score of 70% indicates a passing grade on the exam. Upon successful completion of the examination, one will be labeled as a "patent attorney" if he/she has already been admitted to a state or territorial bar. However, engineers, scientists and any other science-based majors, as well as law students and law graduates who are not admitted to a bar, will be labeled as "patent agents" since they cannot give legal advice nor represent clients in court. The latest exam result statistics are for the 2014 fiscal year, when 2,799 exams were administered with 42.8% resulting in passing scores. The pass rate has dropped noticeably since the provisions of the America Invents Act, implemented in March 2013, were first included in the exam. For example, from June 9, 2005 through October 17, 2006, 58.2% of the 4,165 candidates passed the exam, which was based upon MPEP, 8th Edition, Revision 2.  The current exam is based mostly on MPEP, 9th Edition, Revision 08.2017, as of August 16, 2018. Applicants who are not United States citizens and do not reside in the U.S. are not eligible for registration except as permitted by 37 CFR § 11.6(c). None of the world's countries except Canada reciprocates, giving U.S. citizens the right that the U.S. grants to their citizens. However, the Canadian Intellectual Property Office does not grant U.S. patent agents or attorneys the same privileges the USPTO grants Canadian patent agents.

A patent attorney needs an adequate understanding of technology to understand a client's invention and it is generally helpful for applicants to have a scientific or technical background.  Although a technical or scientific degree is not required to take the patent bar, patent lawyers must be capable of understanding the technical and scientific aspects of patents and patent applications.

There are three categories of qualification, through which an applicant for the patent bar may demonstrate the scientific and technical  training  necessary  to  provide  valuable  service  to  patent  applicants:
Category A: bachelor's degree in a required technical subject. The applicant submits proof of completion of an accredited bachelor's degree program in such academic fields as engineering, physics, pharmacology, biology, biochemistry, or computer science. It may be possible to qualify based upon a degree from an unaccredited institution, or a graduate degree in a technical field, and consideration may be given for other training and experience.
Category B: bachelor's degree in another subject. If an applicant does not possess a degree that qualifies the applicant to take the examination under Category A, an applicant with a bachelor's degree must prove to the satisfaction of the OED Director that the applicant possesses scientific and technical training equivalent to  that received at an accredited U.S. college or university for a bachelor's degree in one of the subjects that is acceptable under Category A. Other training and education may be relevant to the determination of qualification for the exam.
Category C: practical engineering or scientific experience. An applicant who relies upon practical engineering or scientific experience but does not qualify under Category A  or B may establish the required technical training by submitting proof of passage of the Fundamentals of Engineering Examination (FE test), a test  of  engineering  fundamentals. 
A candidate must also possess "good moral character and reputation" (37 CFR 11.7).  If practicing outside the United States, a patent agent or patent attorney must be a U.S. citizen.

Notable patent attorneys and agents 

See List of patent attorneys and agents, including fictional characters who are patent attorneys.

See also
European Patent Institute (epi)
International Federation of Intellectual Property Attorneys (FICPI)
Patent engineer
Patent examiner
Power of attorney
Trademark attorney

Notes

References

External links
 Australia
 Patent & Trade Mark Attorneys on IP Australia, the Australian Patent Office
 Find an Attorney, The Institute of Patent and Trade Mark Attorneys Australia 
 Europe
Institute of Professional Representatives before the European Patent Office or "European Patent Institute (epi)"
The Chartered Institute of Patent Attorneys (CIPA) - United Kingdom
Deutsche Patentanwaltskammer - German Chamber of Patent Attorneys, in German
APTMA - Irish Association of Patent & Trade Mark Attorneys
Institut national de la propriété industrielle in French
Compagnie nationale des Conseils en Propriété Industrielle in French
Centre d'Etudes Internationales de la Propriété Industrielle in French
 North America
USPTO database of patent attorneys and agents
USPTO Office of Enrollment and Discipline
 New Zealand
 New Zealand patent office
New Zealand patents
New Zealand patent attorneys
 Singapore
Intellectual Property Office of Singapore
Singapore Register of Patents
 India
List of Registered Patent Agents in India as of April 2010
Patent Agents Association of India

 
Law of the United Kingdom
Legal professions
Lawyers by type